The Poplar River is a river in the Unorganized North part of Nipissing District in northeastern Ontario, Canada. It is in the Great Lakes Basin.

Bear Lake flows via Tilden Lake, the Tomiko River, the Sturgeon River, Lake Nipissing and the French River to Georgian Bay on Lake Huron.

References

Sources

Rivers of Nipissing District